This is an incomplete list of private (independent) schools in the United Kingdom. 

Also refer to the Headmasters' and Headmistresses' Conference for a list of their member schools (boarding and day schools) in the United Kingdom, Crown dependencies and the Republic of Ireland.

England

Scotland

Wales
Atlantic College
Castle School Pembrokeshire
Christ College, Brecon
Ffynone House School
Howell's School Llandaff
Kings Monkton School
Llandovery College
Monmouth School for Boys
Monmouth School for Girls
Myddelton College
Oakleigh House School
Rougemont School
Ruthin School
Rydal Penrhos
St Clare's School, Newton
St David's College, Llandudno
 St Gerard’s School, Bangor
St John's College, Cardiff
St Michael's School, Llanelli
The Cathedral School, Llandaff
 Treffos School, Anglesey
Westbourne House School, Penarth

Northern Ireland
Methodist College Belfast
Rockport School
Belfast Royal Academy
Campbell College
Strathearn School
Foyle and Londonderry College
Portora Royal School
Royal Belfast Academical Institution
Royal School Dungannon
The Royal School, Armagh
Holywood Rudolf Steiner School

See also
List of schools in the United Kingdom
Private school
Private schools in the United Kingdom
Public school (United Kingdom)

External links
 Fully searchable UK school guide independent and state
 Schools accredited by the Independent Schools Council
 School search
 UK Independent School Directory
 School Fees Checker

Independent schools